Cyperus podocarpus is a species of sedge that is native to tropical Africa.

The species was first formally described by the botanist Johann Otto Boeckeler in 1879.

See also 
 List of Cyperus species

References 

podocarpus
Taxa named by Johann Otto Boeckeler
Plants described in 1879
Flora of Benin
Flora of Burkina Faso
Flora of Sudan
Flora of Togo
Flora of the Central African Republic
Flora of Chad
Flora of Ghana
Flora of Guinea
Flora of Mali
Flora of Ivory Coast
Flora of Mauritania
Flora of Niger
Flora of Nigeria
Flora of Senegal
Flora of Sierra Leone